Owston's tit (Sittiparus owstoni) is a small passerine bird in the tit family Paridae that is endemic to the southern Izu Islands south of Japan.

Owston's tit was formerly considered as subspecies of the varied tit but was promoted to species status based on the results of a phylogenetic study published in 2014. The species was first described by Ijima Isao in 1893, based on two females from Miyake-jima obtained by Alan Owston's collector, and named Parus owstoni in his honour. This was the first description of a bird by a zoologist from Japan.

It is larger than the varied tit, and lacks the buffish forehead and side of neck.

References 

Owston's tit
Izu Islands
Endemic birds of Japan
Owston's tit